Bob O'Malley may refer to:

Robert Edmund O'Malley (born 1939), American mathematician
Robbie O'Malley (born 1965), Irish Gaelic footballer